Eleanor Stackhouse Atkinson (1863 – November 4, 1942) was an American author, journalist and teacher.

Early years
She was born Eleanor Stackhouse in Rensselaer, Indiana, and later married Francis Blake Atkinson, himself also an author—the couple had children Dorothy Blake (b. 1892) and Frances Eleanor (b. 1899).

Career
She taught in schools in both Indianapolis and Chicago. She wrote for the Chicago Tribune as a stunt girl reporter under the pseudonym "Nora Marks" from 1888 to 1890, and later became publisher of the Little Chronicle Publishing Company, Chicago; this published several of her own works, along with other educational books and the Little Chronicle, an illustrated newspaper intended for young children. 

While she wrote both fiction and non-fiction, the former mostly romances and the latter mostly educational books, she is best known for her 1912 novel Greyfriars Bobby. This popular work recounted the famous story of the eponymous dog; most of the modern versions of the story seem to stem from her form of the tale. Many details of the book, especially those regarding the  dog's master are inaccurate; until recently it was assumed that she had no opportunity for original research of her setting. It seems likely that she worked from the basic story and embellished it from her own imagination. The story, however, is lovingly detailed; the descriptions of the geography may be somewhat confused, but effort was clearly made to get names correct, and to get across the atmosphere of the city. Unusually for someone with no connection to the country, her portrayal of the local accent was convincing and strongly phrased; this suggests it is possible she picked up the story directly from Scottish immigrants to the Midwest.

 "I wullna gang to the infairmary. It's juist for puir toon bodies that are aye ailin' an' deein'." Fright and resentment lent the silent old man an astonishing eloquence for the moment. "Ye wadna gang to the infairmary yer ainsel', an' tak' charity."

The book is often considered a classic, especially for children, and has been reprinted several times; it was the basis for the films Challenge to Lassie (MGM, 1949) and Greyfriars Bobby (Disney, 1961), although both of these postdated her death. Both films starred Donald Crisp.

Personal life
Blake's daughter, Eleanor Blake, wrote a detective novel, Death Down East (1942). Her son, Atkinson's grandson, was the movie and television actor Wally Cox. Her husband Francis Atkinson was a fellow newspaperman and opened The Little Chronicle along with her.

Selected works
Mamzelle Fifine : A Romance of the Girlhood of the Empress Josephine on the Island of Martinique (1903)
Boyhood of Lincoln (1908) (also published as Lincoln's Love Story)
Story of Chicago and National Development, 1534-1910. (1910)
New Student's Reference Work for Teachers, Students and Families (1911)
Greyfriar's Bobby (1912)
Loyal Love (1912)
Johnny Appleseed: The Romance of the Sower (1915)
Pictured Knowledge; Visual Instruction Practically Applied for the Home and School (1916)
Hearts Undaunted : A Romance of Four Frontiers (1917)
"Poilu," a Dog of Roubaix. (1918)

References

External links

 
 
Eleanor Atkinson: a tribute site by Inez Visser

1863 births
1942 deaths
19th-century American writers
20th-century American novelists
American women novelists
American women journalists
20th-century American women writers
19th-century American women writers
People from Rensselaer, Indiana
20th-century American non-fiction writers
Schoolteachers from Indiana
American women educators